Glen Huntly is a suburb of Melbourne, Victoria, Australia.

Glen Huntly or Glenhuntly or variant, may refer to:

 Glen Huntly Road, Melbourne, Victoria, Australia
 Glen Huntly, Victoria, Australia; a suburb of Melbourne
 Glenhuntly railway station, Glen Huntly, Melbourne, Victoria, Australia
 Glenhuntly tram depot, Caulfield South, Melbourne, Victoria, Australia
 Electoral district of Glenhuntly, Victoria, Australia

See also

 
 
 Huntley (disambiguation)
 Huntly (disambiguation)
 Glen (disambiguation)